Koleen is an unincorporated community in Jackson Township, Greene County, Indiana.

History
Koleen was likely named for the valuable kaolin clay deposits in the area. The Koleen post office was established in 1877.

Geography

References

Unincorporated communities in Greene County, Indiana
Unincorporated communities in Indiana
Bloomington metropolitan area, Indiana